Torrey Craig (born December 19, 1990) is an American professional basketball player for the Phoenix Suns of the National Basketball Association (NBA). He played college basketball for the USC Upstate Spartans, where he was named an honorable mention All-American and Atlantic Sun Conference Player of the Year in 2012.

After graduating from USC Upstate in 2014, Craig spent his first three professional seasons in Australia and New Zealand. He was named New Zealand NBL MVP and won a New Zealand NBL championship with the Wellington Saints, and earned NBL Best Defensive Player honors with the Brisbane Bullets. In 2017, he began his NBA career with the Denver Nuggets. He has also played for the Milwaukee Bucks and Indiana Pacers.

College career
Craig went to the University of South Carolina Upstate from Great Falls High School in Great Falls, South Carolina, after winning 1A state Player of the Year honors in his senior season.  As a freshman, Craig entered the starting lineup and quickly made an impact, averaging 14.4 points and 7.2 rebounds per game en route to winning Atlantic Sun Conference Freshman of the Year honors.

In his sophomore season, Craig led the A-Sun in scoring at 16.4 points per game and helped the Spartans win 21 games.  Craig was named the conference Player of the Year and an honorable mention All-American by the Associated Press.  As a junior, Craig once again led the A-Sun in scoring at 17.2 points per game.  He was named first team All-Atlantic Sun.

Prior to the start of his senior season, Craig was named preseason Player of the Year in the Atlantic Sun.  On February 10, 2014, Craig reached the 2,000 career point milestone with a 22-point game against East Tennessee State.

Professional career

Cairns Taipans (2014–2015) 
On August 6, 2014, Craig signed with the Cairns Taipans in Australia for the 2014–15 NBL season. He was named NBL Player of the Week for Round 9 after recording 19 points and 10 rebounds against the Adelaide 36ers on December 6. On December 19, he scored a season-high 28 points in a 90–86 loss to the 36ers. He helped the Taipans finish the season in first place with a 21–7 record before going on to reach the grand final series, where they lost 2–0 to the New Zealand Breakers. In 32 games, he averaged 8.9 points, 5.7 rebounds and 1.2 assists per game.

Wellington Saints (2015) 
Following the 2014–15 NBL season, Craig joined the Wellington Saints for the 2015 New Zealand NBL season. On April 17, he scored 41 points against the Taranaki Mountainairs, ending the game one point shy of the all-time Saints scoring record, held by Mike Efevberha with 42. He was named Player of the Week for Round 3 after also recording 25 points and 14 rebounds against the Southland Sharks on April 18. He was again named Player of the Week for Round 11. He missed the end of the regular season with a knee injury. He helped the Saints reach the grand final, where they lost to the Sharks 72–68. For the season, he was named the NZNBL MVP and was named to the NZNBL All-Star Five. In 17 games, he averaged 20.4 points, 9.1 rebounds, 1.8 assists, 1.0 steals and 1.2 blocks per game.

Return to the Taipans (2015–2016) 
On August 7, 2015, Craig re-signed with the Cairns Taipans for the 2015–16 NBL season. On October 24, 2015, he recorded 18 points and 10 rebounds in a loss to Melbourne United. On January 13, 2016, in another loss to United, Craig became the first Taipans player to have at least 20 points and 15 rebounds in a game since Nathan Jawai did so in 2008. The Taipans missed the playoffs in 2015–16 with a 12–16 record. Craig appeared in all 28 games, averaging 11.6 points, 6.1 rebounds, 1.0 assists and 1.1 blocks per game.

Return to the Saints (2016) 
Following the 2015–16 NBL season, Craig re-joined the Wellington Saints for the 2016 New Zealand NBL season. He was twice named Player of the Week. He helped the Saints reach the grand final, where they defeated the Super City Rangers 94–82 to win the championship, with Craig scoring 15 points. He appeared in all 20 games for the Saints in 2016, averaging 20.9 points, 9.8 rebounds, 2.9 assists and 1.3 steals per game. He subsequently earned NZNBL All-Star Five honors for the second straight year.

Brisbane Bullets (2016–2017)
On May 9, 2016, Craig signed a two-year deal with the Brisbane Bullets, a team re-joining the NBL for the 2016–17 season after an eight-year hiatus. He made his debut for the Bullets in their season opener on October 6, scoring a team-high 16 points in a 72–65 win over the Perth Wildcats. Two days later, he had 17 rebounds in a 77–73 win over the Sydney Kings. On November 19, he scored a career-high 34 points in a 105–87 win over the Adelaide 36ers. In the Bullets' season finale on February 11, 2017, Craig had 30 points and 18 rebounds in a 106–79 loss to the Illawarra Hawks. He became just the second player in eight years to have 30 points and 18 rebounds in a game. The Bullets finished the season at the bottom of the ladder with a 10–18 record. For the season, Craig was named the NBL Best Defensive Player and earned All-NBL Second Team honors. Craig appeared in all 28 games for the Bullets in 2016–17, averaging 15.2 points, 8.0 rebounds, 1.5 assists and 1.1 steals per game.

Gold Coast Rollers (2017) 
Following the 2016–17 NBL season, Craig joined the Gold Coast Rollers of the Queensland Basketball League. He scored 30 points or more five times, including two 40-point games. He was named Player of the Week for Round 3. In 10 games for the Rollers, he averaged 28.2 points, 9.9 rebounds, 4.0 assists, 1.5 steals and 1.0 blocks per game.

Denver Nuggets (2017–2020)
In June 2017, Craig returned to the United States to join the Denver Nuggets for NBA Summer League. On July 19, 2017, he signed a two-way contract with the Nuggets. On the two-way deal, Craig spent most of the season in the NBA G League with the Sioux Falls Skyforce due to the 45-day limit he could spend with the Nuggets. Craig made his NBA debut on November 28, 2017, in the Nuggets' 106–77 loss to the Utah Jazz, joining Mike Gibson as the only players in Upstate history to play in an NBA game. Craig made his first career start on December 15, 2017, against the New Orleans Pelicans, scoring six points in a 117–111 overtime win. Three days later, he scored a season-high 14 points in a 95–94 loss to the Oklahoma City Thunder. On April 1, 2018, he recorded seven points and a season-high eight rebounds in a 128–125 overtime win over the Milwaukee Bucks.

On July 10, 2018, Craig signed a two-year, $4 million contract with the Nuggets. On February 1, 2019, he scored a then career-high 22 points in a 136–122 win over the Houston Rockets. In game four of the Nuggets' first-round playoff series against the San Antonio Spurs, Craig scored 18 points with five 3-pointers in a 117–103 win.

On March 1, 2020, Craig scored a season-high 17 points against the Toronto Raptors. In the COVID affected 2019–20 NBA season, Craig averaged 5.4 points and 3.3 rebounds during the regular season and once again proved his worth while checking some of the NBA's best wings during the postseason.

On November 17, 2020, the Nuggets extended Craig a $2.5 million qualifying offer to make him a restricted free agent. They withdrew the qualifying offer four days later, thus making him an unrestricted free agent.

Milwaukee Bucks (2020–2021)
On November 26, 2020, Craig signed with the Milwaukee Bucks.

Phoenix Suns (2021)
On March 18, 2021, Craig was traded to the Phoenix Suns in exchange for cash considerations. On April 25, 2021, he had 20 points and 14 rebounds off the bench against the Brooklyn Nets. In the 2021 NBA Finals against his former team the Milwaukee Bucks, he averaged 2.8 points and 1.3 rebounds across the six games. The Suns lost the series 4–2.

Indiana Pacers (2021–2022)
On August 20, 2021, Craig signed with the Indiana Pacers. On October 29, 2021, he scored a career-high 28 points, to go with 11 rebounds, in a loss to the Brooklyn Nets.

Return to Phoenix (2022–present)
On February 10, 2022, Craig was traded back to the Phoenix Suns in exchange for Jalen Smith and a 2022 second-round draft pick.

Personal life
Craig's son, Braylon, was born on June 4, 2014.

NBA career statistics

Regular season

|-
| style="text-align:left;"| 
| style="text-align:left;"| Denver
| 39 || 5 || 16.1 || .453 || .293 || .629 || 3.3 || .6 || .3 || .4 || 4.2
|-
| style="text-align:left;"| 
| style="text-align:left;"| Denver
| 75 || 37 || 20.0 || .442 || .324 || .700 || 3.5 || 1.0 || .5 || .6 || 5.7
|-
| style="text-align:left;"| 
| style="text-align:left;"| Denver
| 58 || 27 || 18.5 || .461 || .326 || .611 || 3.3 || .8 || .4 || .6 || 5.4
|-
| style="text-align:left;"| 
| style="text-align:left;"| Milwaukee
| 18 || 0 || 11.2 || .391 || .364 || .500 || 2.4 || .9 || .5 || .4 || 2.5
|-
| style="text-align:left;"| 
| style="text-align:left;"| Phoenix
| 32 || 8 || 18.8 || .503 || .369 || .800 || 4.8 || 1.0 || .6 || .6 || 7.2 
|-
| style="text-align:left;"| 
| style="text-align:left;"| Indiana
| 51 || 14 || 20.3 || .456 || .333 || .771 || 3.8 || 1.1 || .5 || .4 || 6.5
|-
| style="text-align:left;"| 
| style="text-align:left;"| Phoenix
| 27 || 2 || 20.8 || .450 || .323 || .706 || 4.3 || 1.2 || .8 || .6 || 6.9
|- class="sortbottom"
| colspan=2 style="text-align:center"| Career
| 300 || 93 || 18.7 || .456 || .330 || .693 || 3.6 || .9 || .5 || .5 || 5.7

Playoffs

|-
| style="text-align:left;"| 2019
| style="text-align:left;"| Denver
| 14 || 11 || 23.6 || .478 || .472 || .563 || 5.1 || .9 || .5 || .4 || 6.6
|-
| style="text-align:left;"| 2020
| style="text-align:left;"| Denver
| 19 || 3 || 19.7 || .423 || .262 || .692 || 3.3 || .7 || .4 || .4|| 4.5
|-
| style="text-align:left;"| 2021
| style="text-align:left;"| Phoenix
| 22 || 0 || 12.1 || .427 || .405 || .615 || 2.9 || .4 || .0 || .4 || 4.0
|-
| style="text-align:left;"| 2022
| style="text-align:left;"| Phoenix
| 9 || 0 || 7.6 || .364 || .300 || .500 || 1.7 || .6 || .4 || .2 || 2.2
|- class="sortbottom"
| colspan=2 style="text-align:center"| Career
| 64 || 14 || 16.3 || .434 || .368 || .614 || 3.3 || .6 || .3 || .3 || 4.5

References

External links

 Brisbane Bullets profile
 USC Upstate Spartans bio
 "Aussie Craig" at nbl.com.au
 "Gold Coast Rollers’ signing Torrey Craig Torrey has dream of representing Australia" at goldcoastbulletin.com.au
 "Craig gives up on NBA dream, finds Nugget of hope in Summer League" at couriermail.com.au
 

1990 births
Living people
American expatriate basketball people in Australia
American expatriate basketball people in New Zealand
American men's basketball players
Basketball players from Columbia, South Carolina
Brisbane Bullets players
Cairns Taipans players
Denver Nuggets players
Indiana Pacers players
Milwaukee Bucks players
Phoenix Suns players
Sioux Falls Skyforce players
Small forwards
Undrafted National Basketball Association players
USC Upstate Spartans men's basketball players
Wellington Saints players